Mailly-Champagne is a commune in the Marne department in north-eastern France.

Population (2017): 661. Inhabitant Name: maillotin(e).

Mailly-Champagne is a small village inserted in Champagne vineyard on the north of the Montagne de Reims, 8 km south of Reims, and on the north of Épernay.

Champagne
Mailly is known for its Champagne. The village's vineyards are located in the Montagne de Reims subregion of Champagne, and are classified as Grand Cru (100%) in the Champagne vineyard classification.

See also
Communes of the Marne department
Classification of Champagne vineyards
Champagne Mailly
Montagne de Reims Regional Natural Park

References

Maillychampagne
Grand Cru Champagne villages